Gostaresh Foolad Kowsar Tabriz Futsal Club was an Iranian futsal club based in Tabriz. In June 2012 Gostaresh Foolad terminated their Futsal activities. Hilal Ahmar Tabriz took over their license.

Season-by-season 
The table below chronicles the achievements of the Club in various competitions.

Current squad 2011-12

See also 
 Gostaresh Foolad F.C.

References

External links 
 Official website

Futsal clubs in Iran
Sport in Tabriz
Defunct futsal clubs in Iran
2008 establishments in Iran
2012 disestablishments in Iran
Futsal clubs established in 2008
Sports clubs disestablished in 2012